Thomas Rangiwahia Ellison, also known as Tom Ellison or Tamati Erihana (c. 1867 – 2 October 1904) was a New Zealand rugby union player and lawyer. He led the first New Zealand representative rugby team organised by the New Zealand Rugby Football Union (NZRFU) on their 1893 tour of Australia. Ellison also played in the 1888–89 New Zealand Native football team on their epic 107-match tour, scoring 113 points, and 43 tries with the side.

Born in Ōtākou, Otago Heads, Ellison was educated at Te Aute College, where he was introduced to rugby. After moving to Wellington, Ellison played for the Poneke Football Club, and was selected to play for Wellington province. He was recruited into Joe Warbrick's privately organised Native football team in 1888, and continued to play for both Poneke and Wellington on his return from that tour. In 1892, he started to refine and popularise the wing-forward system of play, which was a vital element of New Zealand rugby's success until 1932. At the first NZRFU annual general meeting in 1893, he proposed that the playing colours of the New Zealand side should be predominantly black with a silver fern—a playing strip that would give the team their famous name of All Blacks. He retired from playing rugby after captaining the 1893 New Zealand side to New South Wales and Queensland, but continued in the sport as a coach and administrator. Ellison was the author of a coaching manual, The Art of Rugby Football, published in 1902.

As well as being one of the first Māori admitted to the bar, practising as a solicitor, and later as a barrister, Ellison also stood unsuccessfully for the Southern Maori parliamentary seat several times. After contracting tuberculosis in 1904, he was briefly institutionalised before dying later that year.

Early life 
Thomas Rangiwahia Ellison was born in Ōtākou at Otago Heads, to Raniera Taheke Ellison and Nani Weller, sometime between 1866 and 1868. He was named after his paternal grandfather, and his middle name, Rangiwahia, was given in honour of his great-uncle. Ellison was Māori:  of Ngāi Tahu and Kāti Māmoe tribal heritage through his mother, and of Te Āti Awa heritage through his father. Introduced to rugby at the age of around 14 by his cousins at Ōtākou, Ellison later wrote of his first game:

After completing his education at Ōtākou Native School, Ellison was awarded a scholarship in 1882 to attend the famous Māori secondary school Te Aute College in the Hawke's Bay. He started playing organised rugby there, and during his final two years played in the school team that won the Hawke's Bay senior club championship. Later in life Ellison claimed that at Te Aute he learned, "nearly all I ever knew of forward play".

After moving to Wellington, Ellison joined the Poneke Football Club in 1885. The Poneke team played junior club rugby at the time, but were promoted to the senior competition after winning all their matches that year. Following their promotion the side won the Wellington club championship each year from 1886 to 1889. Ellison was selected to play for the Wellington provincial team in 1885, and continued to be selected for Wellington until 1892. He eventually earned 23 caps—a large number for the time. Initially Ellison played as a forward or on the wing, but later played half-back.

New Zealand Native football team 

In early 1888 Joe Warbrick attempted to organise a private party of Māori players to tour Great Britain—later known as the New Zealand Native football team. A cousin of Ellison's, Jack Taiaroa, who had toured with the New Zealand team that travelled to New South Wales in 1884, helped Warbrick recruit players for his proposed tour. It was most likely because of Taiaroa that Ellison was persuaded to join Warbrick's Natives team. Warbrick eventually assembled a side that included both Māori and non-Māori New Zealand-born players, and several players born overseas. The final team consisted of 26 players, and toured New Zealand before departing to Melbourne. They then toured Great Britain, Australia, and finally New Zealand again—the trip lasted 14 months. Ellison played mostly as a forward throughout the tour, and played at least 83 of the team's 107 matches; including a minimum of 58 in Britain.

Ellison played all of the Natives' three internationals—against Ireland, Wales, and England. The Ireland match was the first international of the tour, two months after their arrival in the British Isles. The fixture was played at Lansdowne Road, Dublin, on 1 December 1888, with Ellison in the forwards. Ireland led 3–0 at half-time, but the Natives improved considerably in the second-half, scoring four tries. The third try scored was by Ellison after a counter-attack by George Williams. The try was not converted, but the strong finish from the New Zealanders gave the team a 13–4 victory. The Irish press were surprised by the loss and strongly criticised their team, but Ireland went on to defeat Wales later that season. The match against Wales was later that month, 22 December, in Swansea. Again Ellison played in the forwards, and the Natives dominated for significant periods of the match. Ellison made several strong runs, and at one point crossed the try-line only to be carried back into play. They failed to score, however, and Wales were victorious 5–0 (one conversion and two tries to nil).

One of the most notable events of the Natives' tour occurred during the match against England at Blackheath. Owing to a dispute over the formation of the International Rugby Football Board, England had not played an international in nearly two years. This contributed to at least twelve of their team lacking international experience—however many of their players were from strong club and county sides. The match was notable for a dispute between the New Zealanders and the match referee—Rowland Hill. Early in the second half Ellison attempted to tackle the English player Andrew Stoddart, and in the process managed to rip his shorts off. The Natives' players promptly formed a circle around Stoddart to allow him to replace his clothing without being exposed to the gazes of the crowd. While this was happening one of the English players, Frank Evershed, picked up the ball and scored a try. The New Zealanders protested, believing that play had stopped after claiming Stoddart had called "dead ball". Hill awarded the try however, causing several of the Native players to leave the field in protest. The aggrieved players were eventually persuaded to return, but not before Hill had restarted play. Ellison was very critical of Hill; particularly because Hill was also Secretary of England's Rugby Football Union. Writing after the tour, Ellison said of the incident: "gross as these errors were, they were insignificant when compared with another that Mr Hill committed at the outset of the game, viz, refereeing at all in that game".

The team was generally very well received outside London, and especially in north, where rugby was dominated by the working-class. Reaction to the team in the south, where the public school establishment controlled the game, was less positive, and the sportsmanship of the team was criticised. Despite this, Ellison clearly enjoyed the experience of touring with the team, and in 1902 he wrote—"I shall never forget the trip, notwithstanding the extremely heavy programme of fixtures we had to go through. Perhaps the most delightful part of our experiences was tasted not so much on the field of play as off it".

Thomas Eyton, one of the promoters of the tour, said of Ellison's contribution—"His knowledge of the finer points of the game, his weight, strength and activity rendered his services invaluable." Ellison participated in most of the Natives' matches, scoring 113 points, and 43 tries on tour; this included 23 tries in Britain and Ireland, four in New South Wales, five in Queensland, and ten in New Zealand.

Wing-forward 

After completion of the tour, Ellison continued to play for Poneke and Wellington. While playing with his club, Ellison implemented the use of a wing-forward and seven-man scrum positional system. It is not known exactly who invented the position of wing-forward, but Ellison claimed in The Art of Rugby Football that he had developed it; historian Greg Ryan claims the position was developed in northern England, and that Ellison only refined it after discovering it during the Natives' tour. The distinctive feature of wing-forward play was their role of feeding the ball into the scrum, and subsequently holding onto one of the hookers while the ball progressed through the scrum to the half-back. With the wing-forward bound to the side of the scrum, the opposing half-back would then have to manoeuvre past them to tackle the player with the ball; this would increase the amount of time the half-back would have in possession of the ball before their opposite could tackle them. Ellison claimed that he devised the position while playing for Poneke after he "found it impossible for the smartest of referees to detect and amply penalize off-side interferences of opponents bent on spoiling my passes".

Regardless of the origins of the position, Ellison was instrumental in promoting its adoption throughout New Zealand. Although it is unclear whether the wing-forward was used during the 1893 tour of Australia, by the time of the All Blacks' first test match, played during their 1903 Australian tour, the position was engrained within the New Zealand style of play. The use of a wing-forward provoked controversy both in New Zealand, and later in the British Isles after the All Blacks toured there in 1905; wing-forwards were often accused of off-side obstruction of the opposition half-back. According to Ellison however, if the position was implemented properly, then there would be no cause for complaint. The wing-forward continued as a vital component of New Zealand rugby until long-standing complaints from the unions of the Home Nations resulted in the position being outlawed by the International Rugby Football Board in 1932.

Later rugby career 
In 1892, the New Zealand Rugby Football Union (NZRFU—later renamed New Zealand Rugby Union) was formed by the majority of New Zealand's provincial rugby unions. Ellison was a Wellington provincial administrator, and in 1893 at the inaugural NZRFU annual general meeting proposed the playing strip for the first officially sanctioned New Zealand side—black cap, black jersey with white fern, white knickerbockers and black stockings. The white knickerbockers were eventually replaced with black shorts, and the uniform itself was based upon that worn by the Native team Ellison had toured with. The black uniform inspired the moniker All Blacks—a name which has been adopted by the New Zealand national team since their  Northern Hemisphere tour.

The first NZRFU sanctioned New Zealand team was formed to tour New South Wales and Queensland in 1893, and Ellison was selected as their captain. Three other members of the New Zealand Natives' team were also selected for the side. Ellison played seven matches on the tour, including matches against New South Wales and Queensland. The team won ten of their eleven matches—the one loss being to New South Wales in Sydney. In addition to scoring two tries, Ellison kicked six conversions and a goal from a mark to give him 23 points for the tour—the second highest of any player. The tour was the end of his participation in the sport as a player.

Ellison's complete playing record comprised 117 matches, 68 of which were first-class games. He scored a total of 160 career points, including 51 tries. Ellison continued involvement with rugby as a provincial administrator, provincial referee, and manager. As an administrator, he proposed that players be financially compensated for wages missed while on long tours; this was in 1898—nearly a century before rugby relinquished its amateur status. This proposal applied specifically to tours that travelled outside New Zealand; writing at the time regarding the amateur regulations, Ellison said "I think that these laws were never intended to apply to extended tours abroad." In 1902 he published The Art of Rugby Football, a coaching manual on rugby that also included accounts of his experiences as a player. According to journalist Hayden Meikle the book was one of rugby's "pioneering texts", while Greg Ryan wrote that the book "remains a classic work on early rugby strategy."

Professional and personal life 
Outside of his involvement in rugby, Ellison was a lawyer, and was one of the first Māori admitted to the bar. He practised as an interpreter for the Land Courts and as a solicitor; later, he worked as a barrister in the practices of Brandon & Hislop in Wellington. Ellison was also involved in politics, and stood unsuccessfully for the Southern Maori parliamentary seat several times against Tame Parata, as well as working for government consideration of Ngāi Tahu land claims. He married Ethel May Howell, a daughter of John Howell, on 22 March 1899; the couple had three children, only one of whom survived infancy, daughter Hinemura who died in 1989. In 1904 Ellison was struck down with tuberculosis, and was admitted to Porirua Lunatic Asylum before dying on 2 October that same year. Ellison was buried in Ōtākou, Otago Heads, following the original plan of a burial at Karori. Representatives of Ellison's parents intercepted the body in Porirua, and his wife and Public Trustee then agreed for him to be buried at Ōtākou. There his gravestone reads "One of the greatest rugby footballers New Zealand ever possessed".

Ellison's influence on New Zealand rugby is such that Māori researcher Malcolm Mulholland stated he was "arguably the player who contributed the most to New Zealand rugby". In 1916, when discussing the question of the greatest player New Zealand had produced, the pseudonymous "Touchline" wrote: "I am prepared to say that the late T. R. Ellison... was the greatest of them all." He went on to say: 

Ellison has been inducted into the Māori Sports Hall of Fame, and in 2005 was listed as one of New Zealand's Top 100 History Makers. The New Zealand Native Football team was inducted into the World Rugby Hall of Fame (then the International Rugby Board Hall of Fame) in 2008, the first side awarded the honour.

See also 
 List of 1888–89 New Zealand Native football team matches

Notes

References

Sources

Books and articles

News

Web

External links 

 

1860s births
1904 deaths
New Zealand international rugby union players
New Zealand Māori rugby union players
Ngāi Tahu people
New Zealand rugby union players
People from Otago Peninsula
People educated at Te Aute College
Māori politicians
Te Āti Awa people
19th-century New Zealand lawyers
20th-century deaths from tuberculosis
Wellington rugby union players
Unsuccessful candidates in the 1896 New Zealand general election
Unsuccessful candidates in the 1890 New Zealand general election
Unsuccessful candidates in the 1887 New Zealand general election
19th-century New Zealand politicians

Ellison family
Māori All Blacks players
Tuberculosis deaths in New Zealand
Rugby union players from Otago